In digital audio, the objective difference grade (ODG) is calculated by perceptual evaluation of the audio quality algorithm specified in ITU BS.1387-1.(PEAQ) It corresponds to the subjective difference grade used in human-based audio tests.
The ODG ranges from 0 to −4 and is defined as follows:

References

Further reading 
 
 

Digital audio